The 2015–16 Perth Glory FC W-League season was the club's eighth participation in the W-League, since the league's formation in 2008. The team finished eighth, though they were only two wins from competing in the finals series.

Review and events

Background
In mid-2015, control of the club transferred from Football West to Perth Glory FC. On taking control, the club advertised the head coach role. Incumbent coach Jamie Harnwell declined to apply for his role. Bobby Despotovski was named as Harnwell's replacement in late July 2015. Sam Kerr was named captain of the team. The Glory returned to Ashfield Reserve for a second season.

Season
The Glory opened the season with a 2–1 win over the Melbourne Victory at Broadmeadows Valley Park. After conceding an early goal to the Victory, Caitlin Foord and Sam Kerr each scored a goal to take the points.

Caitlin Foord and Sam Kerr were missing from the Glory's second match lineup after being called up to the national team. Nikki Stanton on loan from Sky Blue FC in the National Women's Soccer League (NWSL) made her debut as the Glory and Jets played out a 0–0 draw at Ashfield Reserve.

Facing the undefeated Melbourne City, the Glory lost 4–0 at home, with former Glory players Marianna Tabain and Lisa De Vanna scoring goals for City.

American player Vanessa DiBernardo joined the Glory on a loan deal from NWSL team Chicago Red Stars in November 2015, scoring a double on debut in a 2–0 away victory over Brisbane Roar. There were injury concerns over Sam Kerr after she suffered an ankle injury and was replaced before half-time. 

The 6 December match against Adelaide United was the first time that Jamie Harnwell, now in charge of the Reds, had faced his former team. The match was scheduled to be held at Hindmarsh Stadium and broadcast nationally as part of an A-League–W-League double-header. With the players about to warm up, a switch of venues to Adelaide Shores Football Centre was announced, with the game kicking off at 7:30pm. Shawn Billam opened the scoring for the Glory in the seventh minute, with Alex Gummer equalising for Adelaide in the 75th minute.

Match results

Legend

W-League

League table

Player details

|}
Source: Soccerway

Transfers
 Note: Flags indicate national team as defined under FIFA eligibility rules. Players may hold more than one non-FIFA nationality.

Transfers in

Transfers out

Loans in

Notes

References

External links
 Official Website

Perth Glory FC (A-League Women) seasons
Perth Glory